Sheung may refer to:

Sheung (surname), Cantonese romanization of various Chinese surnames
Kiki Sheung, Hong Kong TVB actress
Lam Sheung Yee (1934–2009), former football (soccer) defender, coach and announcer, as well as an actor
Lee Sheung-ching (born 1981), Hong Kong film and television actor; he is also a former playwright
Sheung-Wai Tam, OBE, GBS, JP, the President Emeritus of The Open University of Hong Kong

See also
Fanling–Sheung Shui New Town in the New Territories of Hong Kong
Kam Sheung Road, road in Yuen Long District of Hong Kong
Kam Sheung Road station, MTR station located between Pat Heung and Kam Tin in Hong Kong
Shek Sheung River, river in northern New Territories, Hong Kong
Sheung Shui, area in New Territories, Hong Kong
Public housing estates in Sheung Shui, the latest public estate in North District
Sheung Shui Slaughterhouse, slaughterhouse situated in the outer area of Sheung Shui, New Territories, Hong Kong
Sheung Shui station, the penultimate northbound station on the East Rail line in Hong Kong
Sheung Shui Wai, area in Sheung Shui, in the northern part of the New Territories of Hong Kong
Sheung Wan, area in Hong Kong located in the north-west of Hong Kong Island
Sheung Wan Civic Centre, performing arts centre in Queen's Road Central, Hong Kong
Sheung Wan station, the western terminus of the Hong Kong MTR Island line
Sheung Yiu Folk Museum, housed in Sheung Yiu Village, a declared monument of Hong Kong
Sheung Yue River, river in northern New Territories, Hong Kong